The Ghana Athletics Association was founded in 1944 as the Gold Coast Amateur Athletics  Association.On the part of the Ghana Olympic Committee, the Ghana Athletics Association is the only Athletics Association authorized to send athletes to the Olympic Games.

References

Sports organizations established in 1944

National members of the Confederation of African Athletics
Athletics